Marco Antonio Romero is a retired amateur boxer from Nicaragua who competed in the  1992 Summer Olympics at welterweight.  In the first round of the 1992 Olympics, Romero defeated Khyber Shah of Pakistan 7:2.  In the second round, Romero lost to Andreas Otto by RSCH-2.

References

Welterweight boxers
Boxers at the 1992 Summer Olympics
Olympic boxers of Nicaragua
Nicaraguan male boxers
Year of birth missing (living people)
Living people